The 2015 Karachi traffic accident occurred on 10 January 2015, when a passenger bus in transit from Karachi to Shikarpur crashed into an oil tanker killing up to 62 people including 6 children. The bus was carrying up to 80 people, with 62 inside the bus and 10 on top, due to overcrowding. Traveling in the morning, most of the passengers were asleep when the bus crashed.

Only traveling a small distance, the bus crashed in the outskirts of Karachi on a single track road that connects to the Super Highway. The crash occurred because of careless driving, as the driver of the tanker was speeding on the wrong side of the road, and poor conditions on the road. Immediately after the crash, a gas cylinder ignited causing the bus to catch on fire. The heat melted some of the metal frame on the bus, causing rescuers to cut open the vehicle to obtain some of the bodies. Up to 62 passengers were killed because of the crash.

Background
Transportation safety in Pakistan has been poor in recent years. According to the Pakistan Bureau of Statistics there are an average of 9,000 crashes and 4,500 deaths on the road each year.

Aftermath
After the crash, the driver of the oil tanker fled the scene. According to Dr. Seemi Jamali, the 62 bodies were taken to Jinnah Postgraduate Medical Centre. Chief minister of Sindh, Qaim Ali Shah, ordered that there be an investigation into the crash.

See also
List of traffic collisions (2015–present)

References

2010s in Karachi
Karachi traffic accident
Karachi traffic accident
Bus incidents in Pakistan
History of Karachi (1947–present)
History of Sindh (1947–present)